Hezekiah Joslyn (1797-October 30, 1865) was an American physician and abolitionist.

Joslyn homesteaded at what is today (2020) 8560 Brewerton Rd. in Cicero, New York. The homestead is now considered a potential archaeological site. He was an Onondaga County, New York, doctor after 1823 and in 1865 an officer in the county medical society.

Joslyn was a founding member of the Liberty Party, an early advocate of abolitionism founded in the 1840s. His daughter Matilda Joslyn Gage was a suffragist as well as a prominent abolitionist. Their home in Fayetteville, New York, where Hezekiah died, was a station on the Underground Railroad. His tombstone near his former home in Cicero reads "AN EARLY ABOLITIONIST".

Hezekiah's daughter Matilda was mother-in-law of L. Frank Baum, author of The Wonderful Wizard of Oz.

References

Bibliography

 

American people of Scottish descent
Physicians from New York (state)
People from Cicero, New York
19th-century American physicians
New York (state) Libertyites
1797 births
1865 deaths
Underground Railroad people